An information diagram is a type of Venn diagram used in information theory to illustrate relationships among Shannon's basic measures of information: entropy, joint entropy, conditional entropy and mutual information.  Information diagrams are a useful pedagogical tool for teaching and learning about these basic measures of information. Information diagrams have also been applied to specific problems such as for displaying the information theoretic similarity between sets of ontological terms.

References

Information theory
Diagrams
Set theory